The Philadelphia Jr. Jackals  were an independent junior "A" ice hockey team that played in the Mid-Atlantic Division of International Junior Hockey League Super Elite League. The team played their home games at The Rink At Old York Road in Elkins Park, Pennsylvania.

The Jackals were affiliated with the Elmira Jackals minor professional hockey team of ECHL and the Mississauga Chargers hockey team of the OJHL (higher affiliate).

Team history

The team was formed in 2006 as the Delaware Thunder; the team was a member of the America East Hockey League (AEHL) from 2006 until 2008. After the 2007–2008 season in the AEHL, the team announced a move to the Philadelphia metro area and a name change to the Philadelphia Thunder. The team also announced they were joining the new United Junior Hockey League (UJHL).

Following the 2009–2010 UJHL season, on February 12, 2010, the Thunder announced that they had joined the International Junior Hockey League (IJHL) for the 2010–11 season. This move was to shorten travel and keep the games on the East Coast of the US. They played in the IJHL Super Elite League, in the Mid-Atlantic Division, with teams compiled from the New York, New Jersey and New England region. The move to the IJHL also came with the new name, Philadelphia Jr. Jackals, reflecting the affiliation with the Elmira Jackals. The IJHL folded in July 2012 and soon after the Jackals disbanded.

Regular-season records

Reference list

External links
 
 IJHL Site

Amateur ice hockey teams in Pennsylvania